The 2001 Atlanta Braves season marked the franchise's 36th season in Atlanta and 131st overall. The Braves won their seventh consecutive division title. The  season saw the team finish first in the NL East Division with an 88-74 record – the worst among playoff teams in 2001, and also the worst record for the Braves since the 1994 strike-reduced season (meaning the worst record through their run of 11 consecutive division titles starting in 1995). Atlanta finished the season with just a 2 game division lead over the Philadelphia Phillies.

The Braves swept the favored Houston Astros in the NLDS before losing to the eventual World Series champion Arizona Diamondbacks in the NLCS 4-1, in which Randy Johnson and Curt Schilling notably dominated Atlanta's offense.

Offseason
October 31, 2000: Bobby Bonilla was released by the Atlanta Braves.
December 13, 2000: Rico Brogna was signed as a free agent with the Atlanta Braves.
January 26, 2001: Steve Avery was signed as a free agent with the Atlanta Braves.
March 30, 2001: Steve Avery was released by the Atlanta Braves.

Regular season
The Braves played the Mets in the first game in New York after the attacks on the World Trade Center on September 11. The game was played on September 21 and it was a 3-2 victory over the Atlanta Braves.

Opening Day starters
Rafael Furcal
Tom Glavine
Wes Helms
Andruw Jones
Chipper Jones
Brian Jordan
Javy López
B. J. Surhoff
Quilvio Veras

Season standings

Record vs. opponents

Notable transactions

May 10, 2001: Aaron Small was signed as a free agent with the Atlanta Braves.
June 22, 2001: John Rocker was traded by the Atlanta Braves with Troy Cameron (minors) to the Cleveland Indians for Steve Karsay and Steve Reed.
July 5, 2001: Ken Caminiti was signed as a free agent with the Atlanta Braves.
July 31, 2001: Rey Sánchez was traded by the Kansas City Royals to the Atlanta Braves for Brad Voyles (minors) and Alejandro Machado (minors).
August 7, 2001: Quilvio Veras was released by the Atlanta Braves.
August 31, 2001: Julio Franco was purchased by the Atlanta Braves from the Mexico City Tigers (Mexican).

Roster

Player stats

Batting

Starters by position 
Note: Pos = Position; G = Games played; AB = At bats; H = Hits; Avg. = Batting average; HR = Home runs; RBI = Runs batted in

Other batters 
Note: G = Games played; AB = At bats; H = Hits; Avg. = Batting average; HR = Home runs; RBI = Runs batted in

Pitching

Starting pitchers 
Note: G = Games pitched; IP = Innings pitched; W = Wins; L = Losses; ERA = Earned run average; SO = Strikeouts

Other pitchers 
Note: G = Games pitched; IP = Innings pitched; W = Wins; L = Losses; ERA = Earned run average; SO = Strikeouts

Relief pitchers 
Note: G = Games pitched; W = Wins; L = Losses; SV = Saves; ERA = Earned run average; SO = Strikeouts

Postseason

National League Division Series 

Atlanta wins the series, 3-0, over the Houston Astros.

National League Championship Series

Game 1
October 16: Bank One Ballpark in Phoenix, Arizona

Game 2
October 17: Bank One Ballpark in Phoenix, Arizona

Game 3
October 19: Turner Field in Atlanta

Game 4
October 20: Turner Field in Atlanta

Game 5
October 21: Turner Field in Atlanta

Award winners
 Andruw Jones, OF, Gold Glove
 Greg Maddux, Pitcher of the Month, June
 Greg Maddux, Pitcher of the Month, July
 Greg Maddux, P, Gold Glove

2001 Major League Baseball All-Star Game
 Chipper Jones, 3B, starter
 John Burkett, P, reserve

Farm system

References

External links

 2001 Atlanta Braves team page at Baseball Reference

Atlanta Braves seasons
Atlanta Braves season
National League East champion seasons
Atlanta Braves